Armand Jean le Bouthillier de Rancé (9 January 1626, Paris27 October 1700, Soligny-la-Trappe) was an abbot of La Trappe Abbey and the founder of the Trappists.

Early life
Armand Jean le Bouthillier de Rancé was born 9 January 1626 in Paris, the second son of Denis Bouthillier, Lord of Rancé, and Councillor of State. His godfather was the Cardinal Duke of Richelieu; his uncle Victor Le Bouthillier, Archbishop of Tours. 

Armand was originally intended for the Knights of Malta and regularly instructed in military exercises. The death of his older brother caused his father to dedicate him to ecclesiastical service, in order to preserve in the family the former numerous benefices. Hence when ten years old he was commendatory abbot of the Cistercian abbey of La Trappe and two other abbeys, prior of two priories, and canon of Notre-Dame de Paris, which gave him a revenue of about 15,000 livres. At twelve he published a translation of Anacreon with Greek notes. He attended the College d'Harcourt in Paris and went through his course of theological studies with great distinction. In 1651, he was ordained priest by his uncle Victor Le Bouthillier and embarked on a career as a court abbot. The manner of his life was worldly in the extreme. He declined an appointment of bishop of the Diocese of St. Pol de Leon as he considered the income too small. 

In 1652 his father died, leaving him a further increase in estate. At the age of twenty-six he was thus left with practically unlimited wealth. He divided his time between preaching and other sacerdotal obligations, and feasting and the pleasures of fox hunting. He obtained his Doctorate in Theology in 1654. His uncle, who desired him as coadjutor, made him archdeacon, caused him to be elected deputy of the second order to the General Assembly of the French Clergy in 1655, and had him appointed First Almoner to Gaston, Duke of Orléans, in 1656.

Monastic life and reform 
Later in 1660 he assisted at the death of  Duke of Orléans, which made so great an impression on him that he said: "Either the Gospel deceives us, or this is the house of a reprobate". After having taken counsel, he disposed of all his possessions, except the Abbey of La Trappe, which he visited for the first time in 1662.

He retired to his abbey, of which he became regular abbot in 1664 and introduced an austere reform. Rancé's reform focused first and foremost centered on penitence. It prescribed hard manual labour, silence, a meagre diet, isolation from the world, and renunciation of most studies. The hard labour was in part a penitential exercise, in part a way of keeping the monastery self-supportive so that communication with the world might be kept at a minimum. This was also the reason why Rancé had Louis XIV's permission to remove the highway that ran outside the monastic walls. Rancé devoted the little spare time he had to writing spiritual works. Amongst the most important are: Vies de plusieurs solitaires de La Trappe; Le traité de la sainteté et des devoirs de la vie monastique; La règle de s. Benoît, traduite et expliqué selon son véritable esprit, etc. An important episode of his subsequent life was the "Contestation" with Jean Mabillon on the lawfulness of monks devoting themselves to study, which De Rancé denied.

His penitential mode of life made him many enemies, and caused him to be accused of Jansenism, but he refrained from defending himself, until finally, at the request of his most intimate friends, he wrote to the Maréchal de Bellefonds, stating that he had signed the Formula (against Jansenism) without restriction or reservation of any kind; adding that he had always submitted himself absolutely to those whom God had placed over him, i.e., the pope and his bishop.

He resigned his abbacy in 1695, owing to declining health, and died in 1700.

Legacy 
The practices that de Rancé instituted in La Trappe later spread to many other Cistercian monasteries which took up de Rancé's reforms. In time, these monasteries also spread and created new foundations of their own. These monasteries called themselves "Trappist" in reference to La Trappe, the source and origin of their reforms. In 1892, with the approval of Pope Leo XIII, the various Trappist congregations left the Cistercian Order and formed the Trappist Order, then named the 'Order of Reformed Cistercians of Our Lady of La Trappe'.

A biography of his life, was the final work of the Romantic writer and politician, François-René de Chateaubriand, published in 1844.

Bibliography

Works by de Rancé 

 Vies de plusieurs solitaires de La Trappe
 Le traité de la sainteté et des devoirs de la vie monastique
 La règle de s. Benoît, traduite et expliqué selon son véritable esprit

Works about de Rancé

References

External links

1626 births
1700 deaths
Clergy from Paris
Founders of Catholic religious communities
17th-century French Roman Catholic priests
Knights of Malta
French Cistercians
Trappists
French abbots
Burials at La Trappe Abbey